is a 2016 novel by Japanese author Sayaka Murata. It captures the atmosphere of the familiar convenience store that is so much part of life in Japan. The novel won the Akutagawa Prize in 2016. Aside from writing, Murata worked at a convenience store three times a week, basing her novel on her experiences. It was first published in the June 2016 issue of Bungakukai and later as a book in July 2016 by Bungeishunjū. 

The novel has sold over 1.5 million copies in Japan and is the first of Murata's novels to be translated into English. The translation, by Ginny Tapley Takemori, was released by Grove Press (US) and Portobello Books (UK) in 2018. The book has further been translated into more than thirty languages.

Plot
Keiko Furukura is a 36-year-old woman who has been working part-time at a convenience store, or konbini, for the last 18 years. She has known since childhood that she is "different" and that expressing her own views and actions is inexplicable and distressing to others, and causes problems. 

The highly regulated world of the konbini, where each action is prescribed by the corporate manual, allows her to maintain an identity acceptable to those around her and a sense of purpose. She models her behaviour, dress style, and even speech patterns on those of her coworkers. Keiko maintains some friendships and a relationship with her sister, but finds it increasingly difficult to explain why, after 18 years, she is still single and working as a temp in a convenience store.

Keiko meets Shiraha, a man who cannot hold a steady job and lives on the fringes of society since he doesn't conform to "normal" expectations. While they have no affection for each other, Shiraha eventually moves in with Keiko. They decide that by pretending to be a couple, they can avoid problems with families and a society that expects them to have romantic relationships, children, and stable jobs.

As part of the plan, Keiko eventually quits her job in the konbini, though she immediately feels that her life has lost purpose. She stays home doing nothing, and only at Shiraha's insistence applies for steady jobs.

On the way to the first job interview, Keiko and Shiraha stop at a konbini. She sees that the store is not as regulated and immediately begins rearranging the merchandise and assisting the staff. When Shiraha confronts her, she explains that her purpose in life is to be a konbini employee, even though she knows that it would be easier and more convenient for her to live the semblance of a "normal" life with him. She then walks away from an enraged Shiraha, cancels the interview, and resolves to find herself a new konbini.

Background

Murata herself works at a convenience store on a part-time basis. In a profile for The New York Times, the author explained she "wanted to illustrate how odd the people who believe they are ordinary or normal are" and that she admires Keiko's character, who chooses and is fine with not having sex at all. She says that she wanted to write from the perspective of "someone who defied conventional thinking, particularly in a conformist society".

Reception

Joyce Lau of the South China Morning Post gave the novel four out of five stars, calling it a "cutting commentary on the pressure society puts on its citizens, particularly single women." Julie Myerson of The Guardian gave the novel a generally positive review, calling it "sublimely weird" and praising the "nutty deadpan prose and even more nuttily likable narrator."

The novel won the prestigious Akutagawa Prize, and Murata was named one of Vogue Japans Women of the Year.

Radio adaptation
The novel was adapted into a radio drama on NHK-FM's  and was broadcast from 22:00 to 22:50 on 30 November 2019. Chiaki Kuriyama voiced the role of the protagonist Keiko Furukura.

See also
 List of Japanese women writers
 Akutagawa Prize

References

External links
 Convenience Store Woman at Grove Atlantic

2016 Japanese novels
Bungeishunjū books
Novels set in Japan
Works originally published in Bungakukai
Novels adapted into radio programs
First-person narrative novels
Akutagawa Prize-winning works
Grove Press books
Portobello Books books